Lyle, Lyle, Crocodile (Original Motion Picture Soundtrack) is the soundtrack album to the 2022 film Lyle, Lyle, Crocodile, directed by Will Speck and Josh Gordon, based on the children's story of the same name and its prequel The House on East 88th Street by Bernard Waber. The album featured original songs written by Benj Pasek and Justin Paul along with Ari Afsar, Emily Gardner Xu Hall, Mark Sonnenblick, and Joriah Kwamé, alongside classical songs written by Elton John and Stevie Wonder. Shawn Mendes, who voices the titular crocodile, had provided vocals for eight of the tracks. The album was released by Island Records on September 30, 2022. Lyle, Lyle, Crocodile (Original Motion Picture Score), another album featuring original score composed by Matthew Margeson was released on October 7, 2022 by Madison Gate Records.

Background 
The directors Will Speck and Josh Gordon had zeroed in songwriters Benj Pasek and Justin Paul, known for their work in La La Land (2016) and The Greatest Showman (2018), understanding the importance of the project as a musical. During the production, Pasek and Paul agreed to executively produce the film as the premise of a singing crocodile, made the film "exciting". But, with Mendes, being the voice actor, the duo "blended musical theater with contemporary pop, aiming to create something with his voice". The duo then brought an array of writers: Ari Afsar, Emily Gardner Xu Hall, Mark Sonnenblick, and Joriah Kwamé, to write the tunes for the album. The writers and musicians had to collaborate remotely using Google Docs and Zoom, due to COVID-19 pandemic. Will Speck and Josh Gordon had worked on mostly diegetic music, with Mendes performing the majority of the tracks as a singing crocodile.

The first track written for the film, was "Take a Look at us Now" performed by Javier Bardem as Hector, a showman and magician, which was a "charming and energetic anthem". Pasek wanted an energetic number, which also reflects the relationship between Lyle, Hector, and Josh (Winslow Fegley), with Kwamé suggesting the hook line, gave the song "the fire element which needed". The second song "Rip Up the Recipe" is an upbeat number performed by Constance Wu who plays Mrs. Primm, Josh's mother. While the song originally had lyrics reflecting her passion for cooking, in the film, Primm was revealed to be a cookbook author, hence they accommodated the lyrics to suit her character. Another ballad song "Carried Away", according to Pasek and Paul, "encapsulates the movie’s central theme of belonging", as in a sequence, Lyle is in a Zoo, "and the lyrics reflect his desire to live free". Pasek says "It’s this character trying not to give in to sadness instead of indulging in a feeling".

The executive producer Ian Eisendrath said "Since Lyle can only communicate through singing, Shawn’s delivery of every note, rhythm, and lyric needed to function on two levels – letting us into Lyle’s interior life and deepening and furthering his character and story." Kwamé also opined that Mendes' expressions at the end of his phrases "works well for musical theater". Mendes felt that writing music for a film was a challenging, as well as an inspiring process, but also said "The hardest part though is that when you are singing for a film instead of your own album, you really have to ace the nuances of the emotion behind every lyric and every note and match it to how the character will be portraying it on screen. That was a learning experience." He also felt "really comfortable" on voicing the titular crocodile as it sings throughout the film.

Release 
On September 21, 2022, Shawn Mendes revealed the track list of the original soundtrack, which features 15 tracks. The incorporated songs of the film include Elton John's "Crocodile Rock", Stevie Wonder's "Sir Duke", Pete Rodriguez's "I Like It Like That", while also including original tracks written by Pasek, Paul, Shawn Mendes and an array of writers. An original song written and performed by Mendes, titled "Heartbeat" was released as the album's first single on September 23, 2022. The soundtrack was released on September 30, by Island Records.

Track listing

Charts

Score album 

In June 2022, Matthew Margeson was reported to score the film. The score album was released by Madison Gate Records on October 7.

References 

2022 soundtrack albums
Island Records soundtracks
Madison Gate Records soundtracks
Pop soundtracks
Shawn Mendes albums